Sonia Graham (born Sonia Mary Biddlecombe; 22 August 1929 – 18 February 2018) was an English actress whose career spanned over 40 years. She appeared in several British television series.

She trained at the Guildhall School of Music and Drama, having previously worked as a dancer, making her professional debut aged 13 with the Carl Rosa Opera Company. After early acting experience in repertory theatre, Graham played Mary Ellen in Meet Me by Moonlight in the West End, and an excerpt from this on the BBC's Theatre Night became her TV debut, in 1957. Her big break, however, came three years later when she played Mary Bewick in the television series A House Called Bell Tower.

From 1962 to 1963 she played Maggie Clifford in 63 episodes of the TV series Compact. In 1966 she appeared in six episodes of Foreign Affairs as Irinka. In 1968 she was a series regular in Crime Buster. Between 1974-78, Graham portrayed Assistant Governor Martha Parrish in the Within These Walls series.

In 1978 she began the recurring role of the cat-obsessed Mrs Bond in All Creatures Great and Small. She appeared three times in the series' original run (1978–80), and once in its 1988–90 revival.

In 1984 she appeared as Ethel Ledbetter in 32 episodes of the series One by One. In 1995 Graham began the role of Evgenia in London's Burning for 27 episodes.

Death
Graham died on 18 February 2018, aged 88, in Wandsworth, London.

References

External links

1929 births
2018 deaths
English stage actresses
English television actresses
People from Croydon
Actresses from London
Alumni of the Guildhall School of Music and Drama